Frederick Merriman may refer to:

Frederick Merriman (politician) (1818–1865), New Zealand politician
Frederick Merriman (athlete), tug of war Olympian